A honey bun is a fried yeast pastry that contains honey and a swirl of cinnamon in the dough and is glazed with icing. Unlike most sweet rolls, which are generally the product of bakeries, honey buns are common convenience store and vending machine fare made by companies like Little Debbie, Hostess and Duchess. Normally sold individually wrapped, alone, or in boxes, they are a snack or grab-and-go breakfast item which can be eaten cold or heated.

History
Honey buns were said to have originated around 1954 in Greensboro, North Carolina by Howard Griffin of the Griffin Pie Company.

Culture
Honey buns are also used as currency in United States prisons, where they are sold from prison commissaries. In the state of Florida, 270,000 are sold per month as of 2010. In a highly publicized instance, honey buns were used by guards in Miami to pay for the beating of a teenager in a youth detention center, resulting in the teen's death. Referring to the case, a public defender was quoted as saying, "In here, a honey bun is like a million dollars."

See also

 Cinnamon roll
 List of buns
 List of sweet breads
 Sticky bun
 Sweet roll

References

Sweet breads
Buns